"Don't Tell Me" is a song by English synth-pop duo Blancmange, released in March 1984 as the third single from their second studio album Mange Tout (1984). Written by Neil Arthur and Stephen Luscombe, and produced by Peter Collins, "Don't Tell Me" reached No. 8 in the UK and remained in the charts for ten weeks. A music video was filmed in Valencia to promote the single.

Critical reception
Upon release, Debbi Voller of Number One stated: "Blancmange are back with a joyous and uplifting romp that could make them the flavour of the month. This song's so bouncy it sounds as if [it was] recorded on a highly sprung trampoline." Tom Hibbert of Smash Hits commented: "Neil Arthur sings of climbing mountains, touching skies and other unlikely physical feats to an energetic electro-pop backing that, if not thoroughly satisfying, contains a certain perky appeal." Billboard considered the song to have "an engaging melody with jagged and exotic studio effects".

In a retrospective review of Mange Tout (1984), Bill Cassel of AllMusic considered the song to be "nigh irresistible". Paul Scott-Bates of Louder Than War described the song as "poppy and catchy" with a "towering chorus". He added that it "maybe came the closest to repeating the Eastern sound of "Living on the Ceiling"."

Track listing
7" single
 "Don't Tell Me" – 3:28
 "Get Out of That" – 4:22

12" single
 "Don't Tell Me" – 6:28
 "Get Out of That" – 4:22

12" single (US release)
 "Don't Tell Me (Extended Version)" – 6:22
 "Don't Tell Me (Edit)" – 3:28
 "Get Out of That" – 4:22

12" single (US promo)
 "Don't Tell Me (Remix)" – 6:45
 "Don't Tell Me (Remix Edit)" – 3:09

Chart performance

Year-end charts

Personnel
Blancmange
 Neil Arthur – lead vocals
 Stephen Luscombe – keyboards, synthesizers

Additional personnel
 Deepak Khazanchi – sitar on "Don't Tell Me"
 Pandit Dinesh – tabla and madal on "Don't Tell Me"
 David Rhodes – guitar on "Get Out of That"
 Rick Phylip-Jones – double bass on "Get Out of That"

Production and artwork
 Peter Collins – producer of "Don't Tell Me"
 Julian Mendelsohn – engineer on "Don't Tell Me"
 John Luongo – producer of "Get Out of That"
 Harvey Goldberg, Mark Kamins – remixing on "Don't Tell Me (Remix)" and "Don't Tell Me (Remix Edit)"
 Simon Fowler – photography

References

External links

1984 songs
1984 singles
Blancmange (band) songs
London Records singles
Sire Records singles
Songs written by Neil Arthur
Songs written by Stephen Luscombe
Song recordings produced by Peter Collins (record producer)